Manaure was the name of an indigenous chief or Cacique in Coro (Venezuela) (Venezuela) it may also refer to:

Manaure, Cesar a town and municipality in Colombia
Manaure, La Guajira a town and municipality in Colombia 
Manaure River a river in Colombia flowing through Manaure, Cesar